Matthew Brettingham the Younger (1725 – 18 March 1803) was an architect. He was the eldest son of Matthew Brettingham the Elder and worked also in Palladian style.

He travelled to Italy in 1747, where he purchased sculptures and artwork for his British patrons, including Thomas Coke, 1st Earl of Leicester. He returned to England in 1754.

One of his patrons, Frederick North, Lord North, made him President of the Board of Green Cloth. North and Brettingham had met as young men in Rome. The value of the appointment fell after the passage of the Civil List and Secret Service Money Act 1782, and North appointed Brettingham deputy revenue collector of the Cinque Ports, an office which yielded an income of several hundred pounds a year.

His architectural practice was largely restricted to working for his father until 1769, when his father died, and after that it was limited in scope. In the words of Howard Colvin, "the income derived from his sinecures seems largely to have relieved Brettingham from the need to develop an extensive architectural practice."

References

1725 births
1803 deaths
18th-century English architects
19th-century English people